This is the discography of American drummer Danny Gottlieb.

As leader
 Aquamarine (Atlantic, 1987) with John Mclaughlin, Joe Satriani, John Abercrombie, Mitchel Forman
 Whirlwind (Atlantic, 1989) with Chuck Loeb, Mark Egan
 Brooklyn Blues (Big World, 1991) with Gil Goldstein, John Abercrombie, Jeremy Steig, Chip Jackson
 Beautiful Ballads (Nicolosi Productions, 2005), with Mark Soskin and Chip Jackson
 Jazz Standards (Nicolosi), with Andy Laverne and Chip Jackson
 A.S.A.P (ITM Pacific), with Andy Laverne, Bill Washer, Chip Jackson
 Back to the Past (Nicolosi, 2016), with guest interviews with Don Lamond, and Joe Morello

With Elements
 Elements (Antilles, 1982)
 Forward Motion (Antilles, 1983)
 Illumination (BMG, 1984)
 Liberal Arts (BMG, 1985)
 Spirit River (BMG, 1986)
 Live in the Far East, Vol. 1 (Wavetone, 1987)
 Live in the Far East Vol. 2 (Wavetone, 1988)
 Untold Stories (Wavetone, 1989)
 Blown Away (Wavetone, 1985)

With Pete Levin
 The New Age of Christmas (Atlantic, 1990)
 Masters in this Hall (Levin Productions, 1998)

With Per Daniellson
 Gottlieb-Danielson Project (Clavebop, 2004)

As sideman 
With Joe Beck
 Finger Painting (1995)
 Just Friends (2003)

With Jeff Berlin
 In Harmony's Way (2001)
 Lumpy Jazz (2004)

With the Blues Brothers
 Red, White, and Blues (1984)
 Live in Montreux (1989)
 Live at the House of Blues, Chicago, with Dan Aykroyd (1998)

With Jeff Ciampa
 Signs of Life (1997)
 Jeff Ciampa (2003)

With Contempo Trio
 No Jamf's Allowed (1991)
 Secret of Life (2003)

With Al Di Meola
 Soaring Through a Dream (1985)

With Mark Egan
 Mosaic (1985)
 Touch of Light (1989)
 Beyond Words (1990)
 Freedom Town (2001)
 As We Speak (2006)

With Bill Evans
 Living in the Crest of a Wave (1983)
 Alternative Man (1985)

With Gil Evans Orchestra
 Bud and Bird (1986)
 Farewell (1986)
 Gil Evans Orchestra Tribute (1989)
 The Honey Man (1995)
 Live in Perugia, Vol. 1 (2000)
 Live in Perugia, Vol. 2 (2001)
 Gil Evans Orchestra 75th Birthday Concert live at BBC (2001)

With Gil Goldstein
 Sands of Time (1980)
 Wrapped in a Cloud (1980)

With George Gruntz
 Beyond Another Wall – Live in China (1992)
 Cosmopolitan Greetings (1994)
 Global Excellence (2001)
 The Magic of a Flute (2005)
 Tiger by the Tail (2006)
 Radio Days (2007)

With Haru
 Galactic Age (1992)
 Live at 55 Bar, New York City (2000)
 Live in Japan (2001)

With Jonas Hellborg
 Axis (1988)
 Bass (1988)

With Toninho Horta
 Moonstone (1989)
 Foot on the Road (1994)

With Nando Lauria
 Points of View (1994)
 Novo Brazil (1996)

With Pete Levin
 Party in the Basement (1989)
 Deacon Blues (2007)

With Andy LaVerne
 Andy LaVerne Plays the Music of Chick Corea (Jazzline, 1981)
 Frozen Music (SteepleChase, 1989)
 Stan Getz in Chappaqua (1997)
 Epistrophy (2003)
 Peace of Mind (2005)

With Hubert Laws
 Say it with Silence (1978)
 Malaguena (1996)

With David Mathews
 Tennessee Waltz, featuring John Schofield (1989)
 David Mathews Manhattan Jazz Orchestra (1991)

With John McLaughlin
 Adventures in Radioland (1985)
 Live at Montreux (2004)

With Pat Metheny
 Watercolors (1977)
 Pat Metheny Group (1978)
 American Garage (1979)
 Offramp (1982)
 Travels (1983)
 Secret Story (1992)

With NDR Big Band
 Music of Astor Piazzolla (2007)
 I Concentrate on You (2007)

With Vince Nerlino
 Vince Nerlino Trio (2000)
 Vince Nerlino Group (2003)

With Nguyen Le
 First Act
 Three Trios (1997)

With Richard Niles
 Santa Rita (1998)
 Club De Ranged (1999)

With Chuck Owen and the Jazz Surge
 Madcap (2001)
 Here We Are (2004)

With Pablo Paredes
 Pablo Paredes (2005)
 Africa (2007)

With Fritz Renold
 Starlight (1998)
 Live in Thailand

With Ali Ryerson
 I'll Be Back (1993)
 Portraits in Silver (1994)
 Quiet Devotion (1997)

With Sergio Salvatore
 Sergio Salvatore (1993)
 Tune Up (1994)

With Stan Samole
 Gliding (1990)
 Stan Samole (1995)

With Kenneth Sivertsen
 Remembering North (1993)
 One Day in October (2000)

With Lew Soloff
 My Romance (1994)
 Rainbow Mountain (2000)

With Richard Stoltzman
 Inner Voices (1989)
 Brazil (1991)
 Open Sky (1998)

Soundtracks
 Children of the Corn (1986)
 Turner and Hooch (1994)
 Punchline (1995)
 Family Thing (1996)

With Dino Betti van der Noot
 Here Comes Springtime (1985)
 They Cannot Know (1986)
 They Cannot Know (1987)

With Knut Varnes
 Super Duper
 8/97 (1997)

With Jeremy Wall
 Cool Running (1991)
 Stepping to the New World (1992)

With others
 Gary Burton Quartet with Eberhard Weber – Passengers (ECM, 1976)
 Warren Bernhardt – Ain't Life Grand (1980)
 Mitch Farber – Star Climber (1982)
 Jim Pepper – Comin' and Goin' (Europa, 1983)
 Bob Moses – Visit with the Great Spirit (1983)
 Scott Cossu – Islands (1984)
 Michael Franks – Skin Dive (1985)
 Eliane Elias and Randy Brecker – Amanda (1985)
 Patrick Williams – New York 10th Avenue (1986)
 Randy Bernsen – Mo' Wasabi (1986)
 T Lavitz – From the West (1987)
 Sting and Gil Evans – Last Session (1987)
 Michael Zilber – Heretic (1988)
 Central Park Kids – Play Mozart (1990)
 Michael Gerber and Mark Knobel (1990)
 Tom Malone – Standards of Living (1991)
 Lee Ann Legerwood – You Wish (1991)
 New York Voices – Hearts of Fire (1991)
 Bob Brookmeyer – Electricity (1991)
 Jim Hall – Youkali (1992)
 The Connection – Inside Out (1992)
 Patti Dunham – Repertoire (1992)
 Fred Miller – What's Wrong with This Picture (1993)
 Dina Carroll – So Close (1993)
 Clifford Carter – Walking into the Sun (1993)
 Mann Brothers – Mann to Mann (1993)
 Ben Sidran – Life's a Lesson (1994)
 Helen Schneider – Right as Rain with WDR Big Band (1995)
 Manhattan Jazz Orchestra – Morita (1995)
 Matalex – Indian Summer (1995)
 Sherri Roberts – Dreamsville (1996)
 Boca Livre – Americana (1996)
 The Prodigal Sons – Stranger Things Have Happened (1996)
 Sting – Strange Fruit (1997)
 Doug Munro – Shootin' Pool at Leo's (1997)
 Nnenna Freelon – Maiden Voyage (1998)
 Michael Gerber – This is Michael Gerber (1998)
 Anita Gravine – Lights, Camera, Passion (1999)
 Loren Schoenberg – Out of this World (1999)
 Hue and Cry – Jazz, Not Jazz (1996)
 Neil Sedaka – Tales of Love (1999)
 Jack Lee – From Belo to Seoul (2000)
 Michael Whalen – Mysterious Ways (2001)
 Jack Wilkins – Ridge Running (2002)
 Stanley Jordan – Dreams of Peace (2003)
 Michael Hammer – Rhythm and Blues (2005)
 Per Danielsson Trio – Dream Dancing (2005)
 Ken Serio – Eye to Eye (2005)
 Lutz Buechner – Ring (2005)
 Muriel Anderson – Wildcat (2006)
 Kristin Lomholt – Spell (2006)
 HR Big Band Live with Jack Bruce – More Jack than Blues (2008)
 Alex Clements – Waiting for You (2008)
 Steven Curtis Chapman – Joy (2012)

References 

Discographies of American artists
Jazz discographies
Pop music discographies
Rock music discographies